Agostino Garofalo (born 29 September 1984) is an Italian footballer who plays as a defender for A.S.D. Nocerina 1910.

Career

Siena
On 1 July 2009, Garofalo was signed by Siena for €530,000. on a five-year contract. However, he spent four seasons on loan to Serie B clubs, namely Torino, Bari, Spezia and Modena.

Novara
On 20 August 2014, Garofalo was signed by Lega Pro club Novara on a two-year contract. The club were promoted back to Serie B in 2015. He wore the number 29 shirt for the new season.

Venezia 
In the summer of 2016 he was bought by Venezia.

Gozzano
On 29 January 2020, he joined Serie C club Gozzano.

Nocerina
After nearly nine months at Gozzano, Grofalo moved to A.S.D. Nocerina 1910 on 26 September 2020.

Career statistics

References

External links
gazzetta.it
gazzetta.it

1984 births
Living people
People from Torre Annunziata
Footballers from Campania
Italian footballers
U.S. Salernitana 1919 players
F.C. Grosseto S.S.D. players
A.C.N. Siena 1904 players
S.S.C. Bari players
Spezia Calcio players
Modena F.C. players
Novara F.C. players
Venezia F.C. players
S.S. Turris Calcio players
A.C. Gozzano players
A.S.D. Nocerina 1910 players
Serie A players
Serie B players
Serie C players
Serie D players
Association football defenders